The 1976 Paris Open, also known as the Jean Becker Open, was a Grand Prix men's tennis tournament played on indoor carpet courts. It was the 7th edition of the Paris Open (later known as the Paris Masters). It took place at the Palais omnisports de Paris-Bercy in Paris, France from 25 October through 31 October 1976. Eddie Dibbs won the singles title.

Finals

Singles

 Eddie Dibbs defeated  Jaime Fillol 5–7, 6–4, 6–4, 7–6
 It was Dibbs' 5th title of the year and the 11th of his career.

Doubles

 Tom Okker /  Marty Riessen defeated  Fred McNair /  Sherwood Stewart 6–2, 6–2
 It was Okker's 3rd title of the year and the 64th of his career. It was Riessen's 5th title of the year and the 46th of his career.

References

External links 
 ATP tournament profile